Caseous necrosis or caseous degeneration is a unique form of cell death in which the tissue maintains a cheese-like appearance. It is also a distinctive form of coagulative necrosis. The dead tissue appears as a soft and white proteinaceous dead cell mass.

Etymology
The word caseous means 'pertaining or related to cheese', and comes from the Latin word caseus 'cheese'. Necrosis refers to the fact that cells do not die in a programmed and orderly way as in apoptosis.

Causes
Frequently, caseous necrosis is encountered in the foci of tuberculosis infections. It can also be caused by syphilis and certain fungi.

A similar appearance can be associated with histoplasmosis, cryptococcosis, and coccidioidomycosis.

Pathophysiology
This begins as infection is recognized by the body and macrophages begin walling off the microorganisms or pathogens. As macrophages release chemicals that digest cells, the cells begin to die. As the cells die they disintegrate but are not completely digested and the debris of the disintegrated cells clump together creating soft granular mass that has the appearance of cheese. As cell death begins, the granuloma forms and cell death continues the inflammatory response is mediated by a type IV hypersensitivity reaction.

Some data suggests that the epithelioid morphology and associated barrier function of host macrophages associated with granulomas may prevent effective immune clearance of mycobacteria.

Appearance

In caseous necrosis no histological architecture is preserved.  On microscopic examination with H&E staining, it is characterized by acellular pink areas of necrosis surrounded by a granulomatous inflammatory process.

When the hilar lymph node for instance is infected with tuberculosis and leads to caseous necrosis, its gross appearance can be a cheesy tan to white, which is why this type of necrosis is often depicted as a combination of both coagulative and liquefactive necrosis.

However, in the lung, extensive caseous necrosis with confluent cheesy tan granulomas is typical. The tissue destruction is so extensive that there are areas of cavitation (also known as cystic spaces). See Ghon's complex.

References

External links
 Microscope images of caseous necrosis
 Image of a hilar lymph node demonstrating caseous necrosis
 Image of a caseating granuloma of tuberculosis in the adrenal gland

Histopathology
Tuberculosis
Necrosis